Marian Sypniewski (born 30 April 1955) is a Polish fencer. He won bronze medals in the team foil events at the 1980 and 1992 Summer Olympics.

References

1955 births
Living people
Polish male fencers
Olympic fencers of Poland
Fencers at the 1980 Summer Olympics
Fencers at the 1988 Summer Olympics
Fencers at the 1992 Summer Olympics
Olympic bronze medalists for Poland
Olympic medalists in fencing
Sportspeople from Bydgoszcz
Medalists at the 1980 Summer Olympics
Medalists at the 1992 Summer Olympics
20th-century Polish people
21st-century Polish people